CMFR means:
Completely Mixed Flow Reactor
Center for Media Freedom and Responsibility